Karrie is an English and Swedish feminine given name that is  an alternate form of Carrie and a diminutive form of Caroline and Carol. Notable people referred to by this name include the following:

Given name
Karrie Delaney (born 1978), American politician
Karrie Downey (born 1973), American volleyball player, and coach
Karrie Keyes (born 1967), American audio engineer
Karrie Webb (born 1974), Australian golfer

Nickname
Karrie Karahalios, nickname of Kyratso G. Karahalsio, American computer scientist

Surname
Peter Karrie, whose birthname is Peter Karagianis, (born 1946), Welsh singer

See also

Carrie (name)
Karie (name)
Karriem Riggins
Karrier

Notes

English feminine given names
Swedish feminine given names